The 1908 New York Highlanders season finished with the team in 8th place in the American League with a record of 51–103. Their home games were played at Hilltop Park.

The Highlanders finished in last place, 17 games out of seventh. It was the second-worst season in club history. Starting first baseman Hal Chase left the team in September under allegations that he was throwing games. After Clark Griffith's departure, the Highlanders lost 70 of their last 98 games under new manager Kid Elberfeld.

Regular season 
On June 30, Cy Young of the Boston Red Sox threw a no-hitter against the Highlanders. In the game, Young had 3 hits and 4 RBI's. By now the alternate and equally unofficial nickname "Yankees" was being used frequently to refer to the Highlanders. The New York Times article about Young's no-hitter at "the American League Park" (Hilltop Park's formal name), referred to the club exclusively as "Yankees" throughout the article. Other newspapers continued to use the two nicknames interchangeably.

On September 4, 5 and 7, 1908, Walter Johnson of the Washington Senators shut out the Highlanders in three consecutive games.

Season standings

Record vs. opponents

Roster

Player stats

Batting

Starters by position 
Note: Pos = Position; G = Games played; AB = At bats; H = Hits; Avg. = Batting average; HR = Home runs; RBI = Runs batted in

Other batters 
Note: G = Games played; AB = At bats; H = Hits; Avg. = Batting average; HR = Home runs; RBI = Runs batted in

Pitching

Starting pitchers 
Note: G = Games pitched; IP = Innings pitched; W = Wins; L = Losses; ERA = Earned run average; SO = Strikeouts

Other pitchers 
Note: G = Games pitched; IP = Innings pitched; W = Wins; L = Losses; ERA = Earned run average; SO = Strikeouts

Relief pitchers 
Note: G = Games pitched; W = Wins; L = Losses; SV = Saves; ERA = Earned run average; SO = Strikeouts

Notes

References 
1908 New York Highlanders team page at www.baseball-almanac.com
1908 New York Highlanders at Baseball Reference

New York Yankees seasons
New York Highlanders
New York Highlanders
1900s in Manhattan
Washington Heights, Manhattan